Chris Smith (born February 11, 1992) is an American football defensive end for the Seattle Sea Dragons of the XFL. He was drafted by the Jacksonville Jaguars in the fifth round of the 2014 NFL Draft. Smith has also played for the Cincinnati Bengals and Cleveland Browns. He played college football at Arkansas.

Early years
Smith attended West Rowan High School in Mount Ulla, North Carolina. As a senior, he had 98 tackles and 16.5 sacks.

College career
As a true freshman in 2010, Smith played in six games, recording three tackles. As a sophomore in 2011, he played in 13 games with three starts. He had 31 tackles and 3.5 sacks. As a junior in 2012, he started all 12 games, recording 52 tackles and 9.5 sacks. As a senior in 2013, he had 37 tackles and 8.5 sacks in 12 games.

As a senior in 2013, Smith was a second-team All-Southeastern Conference (SEC) selection.

Professional career

Jacksonville Jaguars
Smith was selected 159th overall in the fifth round of the 2014 NFL Draft by the Jacksonville Jaguars. The pick that was used to select Smith was acquired in a trade that sent Eugene Monroe to the Baltimore Ravens.

He was released by the Jaguars on September 13, 2014. Two days later, he was then signed to their practice squad.  He was promoted to the active roster on October 20.

Cincinnati Bengals
On April 11, 2017, the Jaguars traded Smith to the Cincinnati Bengals in exchange for a 2018 conditional draft pick. Smith was brought in to help a Bengals defense that finished 19th in the league in sacks the previous season. He played in all 16 games, recording a career-high 26 tackles and three sacks.

Cleveland Browns

On March 14, 2018, Smith signed a three-year contract with the Cleveland Browns. He played in 16 games with two starts, recording 21 combined tackles, one sack, two passes defensed, and a forced fumble.

On December 3, 2019, Smith was waived by the Browns. He played in nine games, recording just one tackle.

Carolina Panthers
On March 5, 2020, Smith signed a one-year contract with the Carolina Panthers. On July 30, 2020, Smith was released by the Panthers.

Smith had a tryout with the Las Vegas Raiders on August 23, 2020.

Las Vegas Raiders 
Smith was signed by the Las Vegas Raiders on August 24, 2020. He was released on September 5, 2020, and signed to the practice squad the next day. He was elevated to the active roster on October 10, October 31, November 7, November 21, and November 28 for the team's weeks 5, 8, 9, 11, and 12 games against the Kansas City Chiefs, Cleveland Browns, Los Angeles Chargers, Chiefs, and Atlanta Falcons, and reverted to the practice squad after each game. He was signed to the active roster on December 12, 2020.

Baltimore Ravens
On July 27, 2021, Smith signed a one-year contract with the Baltimore Ravens. He was released on August 31, 2021 and re-signed to the practice squad the next day. He was released on October 19, 2021.

Houston Texans
On September 3, 2021, Smith was signed to the Houston Texans' practice squad. He was promoted to the active roster on December 23, 2021.

Seattle Sea Dragons
Smith signed with the Seattle Sea Dragons of the XFL on March 9, 2023.

Personal life
On September 11, 2019, Petara Cordero, Smith's girlfriend and the mother of one of his three children, was killed after being struck by a passing car after exiting Smith's car, which had become disabled after hitting a median.

References

External links
Arkansas Razorbacks bio
Jacksonville Jaguars bio

1992 births
Living people
People from Salisbury, North Carolina
Players of American football from North Carolina
American football defensive ends
Arkansas Razorbacks football players
Jacksonville Jaguars players
Cincinnati Bengals players
Cleveland Browns players
Carolina Panthers players
Las Vegas Raiders players
Baltimore Ravens players
Houston Texans players
Seattle Sea Dragons players